The 1963 World Table Tennis Championships – Corbillon Cup (women's team) was the 20th edition of the women's team championship. 

Japan won the gold medal and Romania won the silver medal. China and Hungary won bronze medals after reaching the semi-finals.

Medalists

Final tables

Group A

Group B

Group C

Group D

Semifinals

Final

See also
List of World Table Tennis Championships medalists

References

-
1963 in women's table tennis